Meyami Rural District is a rural district (dehestan) in the Central District of Meyami County, Semnan Province, Iran. At the 2006 census, its population was 6,524, in 1,791 families.  The rural district has 16 villages.

References 

Rural Districts of Semnan Province
Meyami County